Codreni may refer to several villages in Romania:

 Codreni, a village in Mileanca Commune, Botoşani County
 Codreni, a village in Gurbănești Commune, Călăraşi County
 Codreni, a village in Roșiești Commune, Vaslui County

and to two places in Moldova:
 Codreni, Cimişlia, a commune in Cimişlia district
 Codreni, a village in Vălcineţ Commune, Ocniţa district

See also
Codru (disambiguation)
Codreanu (surname)